Monograptidae is an extinct family of graptolites of the order Graptoloidea. Monograptids have only one row of thecae per stipe (stem, branch), unlike the biserial graptolites which have two opposing rows of thecae per stipe.

Fossil record
Fossils of Monograptidae are found from the Ordovician to the Devonian (age range: from 460.9 to 402.5 million years ago). They are especially important during the early Silurian. They are known from various localities in Europe, North America, South America, China, Thailand, Australia, Algeria and Morocco.

Genera
Maletz (2014) identifies 98 genera of Monograptidae. The family can possibly be divided into several subfamilies.

†Abiesgraptus Hundt, 1935
†Acanthograptus Tsegelniuk, 1976
†Alexandrograptus Přibyl, 1981
†Atavograptus Rickards, 1974
†Averianowograptus Obut, 1949
†Awarograptus Zalasiewicz & Howe, 2003
†Barrandeograptus Bouček, 1933
†Bohemograptus Přibyl, 1967a
†Bugograptus Tsegelniuk, 1976
†Campograptus Obut, 1949
†Cochlograptus Obut, 1987
†Colonograptus Přibyl, 1942
†Coronograptus Obut & Sobolevskaya, 1968 in Obut et al. (1968)
†Corymbites Obut & Sobolevskaya, 1967 in Obut et al. (1967)
†Crinitograptus Rickards, 1995
†Cucullograptus Urbanek, 1954
†Cultellograptus Loydell & Nestor, 2006
†Cyrtograpsus Carruthers, 1867 in Murchison (1867)
†Damosiograptus Obut, 1950
†Demirastrites Eisel, 1912
†Dibranchiograptus Hundt, 1949
†Didymograptoides Hundt, 1951
†Diversograptus Manck, 1923
†Dulebograptus Tsegelniuk, 1976
†Egregiograptus Rickards & Wright, 1997
†Enigmagraptus Rickards & Wright, 2004
†Euroclimacis Štorch, 1998a
†Falcatograptus Hundt, 1965
†Formosograptus Bouček et al., 1976
†Fterograptus Tsegelniuk, 1976
†Gangliograptus Hundt, 1939
†Globosograptus Bouček & Přibyl, 1948 in Přibyl (1948a)
†Heisograptus Tsegelniuk, 1976
†Hemimonograptus Zhao 1984
†Hubeigraptus Li, 1995
†Huttagraptus Koren’ & Bjerreskov, 1997
†Istrograptus Tsegelniuk, 1976
†Korenea Rickards et al., 1995
†Kurganakograptus Golikov, 1969
†Lagarograptus Obut & Sobolevskaya, 1968 in Obut et al. (1968)
†Lapworthograptus Bouček & Přibyl, 1952
†Lenzia Rickards & Wright, 1999
†Linograptus Frech, 1897
†Lituigraptus Ni, 1978
†Lobograptus Urbanek, 1958
†Lomatoceras Bronn, 1835
†Mediograptus Bouček & Přibyl, 1948 in Přibyl (1948a)
†Metamonograptus Wang, 1977
†Monoclimacis Frech, 1897
†Monograpsus Geinitz, 1852
†Monoprion Barrande, 1850
†Mystiograptus Hundt, 1965
†Neocolonograptus Urbanek, 1997
†Neocucullograptus Urbanek, 1970
†Neodiversograptus Urbanek, 1963
†Neolagarograptus Štorch, 1998b
†Neolobograptus Urbanek, 1970
†Neomonograptus Mu & Ni, 1973
†Obutograptus Mu, 1955
†Oktavites Levina, 1928
†Paradiversograptus Sennikov, 1976
†Paragraptus Hundt, 1965
†Paramonoclimacis Wang & Ma, 1977 in Wang & Jin (1977)
†Pernerograptus Přibyl, 1941
†Polonograptus Tsegelniuk, 1976
†Pomatograptus Jaekel, 1889
†Přibylograptus Obut & Sobolevskaya, 1966
†Pristiograptus Jaekel, 1889
†Prochnygraptus Přibyl & Štorch, 1985
†Procyrtograptus Poulsen, 1943
†Prolinograptus Rickards & Wright, 1997
†Proteograptus Lenz et al., 2012
†Pseudomonoclimacis Mikhailova, 1975
†Pseudostreptograptus Loydell, 1991a
†Quasipernerograptus Zhao, 1984
†Rastrites Barrande, 1850
†Rastrograptus Hopkinson & Lapworth, 1875
†Saetograptus Přibyl, 1942
†Sinodiversograptus Mu & Chen, 1962
†Skalograptus Tsegelniuk, 1976
†Slovinograptus Urbanek, 1997
†Spirograptus Gürich, 1908
†Stavrites Obut & Sobolevskaya, 1968 in Obut et al. (1968)
†Stimulograptus Přibyl & Štorch, 1983
†Streptograptus Yin, 1937
†Tamplograptus Tsegelniuk, 1976
†Testograptus Přibyl, 1967b
†Thuringiograptus Hundt, 1935
†Tirassograptus Tsegelniuk, 1976
†Torquigraptus Loydell, 1993
†Trimorphograptus Zhao, 1984
†Tyrsograptus Obut, 1949
†Uncinatograptus Tsegelniuk, 1976
†Uralograptus Koren’, 1962
†Urbanekia Rickards & Wright, 1999
? †Vietnamograptus van Phuc, 1998
†Wandograptus Rickards & Jell, 2002
†Wolynograptus Tsegelniuk, 1976

References

Graptolites
Prehistoric hemichordate families
Ordovician first appearances
Devonian extinctions